Wantisden is a small village and civil parish in the East Suffolk district of Suffolk in eastern England. Largely consisting of a single farm and ancient woodland (Staverton Park and The Thicks), most of its 30 residents live on the farm estate. It shares a parish council with nearby Butley and Capel St. Andrew. It has a church dedicated to St John the Baptist.

The place-name 'Wantisden' is first attested in the Domesday Book of 1086, where it appears as Wantesdena and Wantesdana. The name means 'Want's dene or valley'.

References

External links
 http://www.genuki.org.uk/big/eng/SFK/Wantisden/
 http://www.visionofbritain.org.uk/place/place_page.jsp?p_id=7848
 http://www.britishlistedbuildings.co.uk/england/suffolk/wantisden

Villages in Suffolk
Civil parishes in Suffolk
Suffolk Coastal